Archduke Otto of Austria can refer to the following members of the Austrian Royal or Imperial family:

 Archduke Otto of Austria (1865–1906), "Otto der Schöne" - father of the last Emperor of Austria.
 Otto von Habsburg, eldest son of Karl, the last Emperor of Austria and King of Hungary.